Thomas Strong may refer to:

 L. Thomas Strong III, Dean of Leavell College at New Orleans Baptist Theological Seminary
 Thomas Strong (bishop) (1861–1944), English theologian and bishop
 Tommy Strong (1890–1917), English footballer
 Thomas Vezey Strong (1857–1920), Lord Mayor of London